In British English, a lido is a public outdoor swimming pool and surrounding facilities, or part of a beach where people can swim, lie in the sun, or participate in water sports. On a cruise ship or ocean liner, the lido deck features outdoor pools and related facilities.

Lido, an Italian word for "beach", forms part of the place names of several Italian seaside towns known for their beaches, such as Lido di Venezia, the barrier beach enclosing the Venetian Lagoon. The term may have found its way into English via English visitors returning from the Lido di Venezia, where people have bathed in the sea since the late 19th century.

See also

History of lidos in the United Kingdom
List of long course swimming pools in the United Kingdom

References
Notes

Sources

External links

 Lidos in the UK Archived

 
Outdoor structures